Dennis Alphons Ronald van de Laar (born 3 February 1994) is a Dutch racing driver.

For 2013 he starts in the FIA European Formula Three Championship with Van Amersfoort Racing.

Career summary 
 2010: Suzuki Swift Cup Netherlands (3rd position)
 2011: Formula Renault 2.0 Northern European Cup (7th position)
 2012: German Formula Three Championship (9th place)
 2013: FIA European Formula Three Championship

References

External links 

 
 
 

1994 births
Living people
Dutch racing drivers
FIA Formula 3 European Championship drivers
German Formula Three Championship drivers
Sportspeople from Haarlem
Formula Renault 2.0 NEC drivers
Prema Powerteam drivers

Mücke Motorsport drivers
Van Amersfoort Racing drivers
Double R Racing drivers
Carlin racing drivers